Robert J. Rodriguez (born April 11, 1976) is a Democratic politician serving as the Secretary of State of New York. He formerly was member of the New York State Assembly, representing the 68th Assembly District based in East Harlem.

Education and early career
The son of former New York Councilman Robert Rodriguez, Robert J. Rodriguez was born and raised in East Harlem. He attended P.S. 112, River East Elementary School, Isaac Newton Middle School, and Cardinal Hayes High School. He holds a B.A. in history and political science from Yale University, and received his M.B.A. from New York University.

Rodriguez worked as a Vice President of a minority-owned public finance firm where he helped municipalities raise money for development and public works projects. During this time, he served as Chairman of Manhattan Community Board 11, representing East Harlem. He has been a member of the Board of Directors of the Upper Manhattan Empowerment Zone Development Corporation, which provided over $95 million in financing and grants to organizations in East Harlem. He has also served on the boards of the Terrance Cardinal Cooke Community Advisory Board, Catholic Charities Community Services of New York, and the Supportive Children's Advocacy Network of NY (Scan NY). He is a member of the New America Alliance, and a fellow on the Council for Urban Professionals (CUP).

Jonathan Rodriguez was born and raised in East Harlem. He attended P.S. 112, River East Elementary School, Isaac Newton Middle School, and Cardinal Hayes High School.

Assembly
Rodriguez represented Assembly District 68, comprising East Harlem and Randalls and Wards Islands. He was elected to his seat in 2010. He was again elected in 2012, running unopposed on both the Democratic and Working Families Party platforms.

Since joining the Assembly, Rodriguez has acted as Chair of the Mitchell-Lama Subcommittee, working to provide affordable housing. In addition, he serves as a member of the Banks, Health, Housing, Labor, Mental Health, and Corporations, Authorities, and Commissions committees. He is a part of the Black, Puerto Rican, Hispanic & Asian Legislative Caucus, and is on the Executive Board of the Puerto Rican/Hispanic Task Force.

A new purportedly grassroots non-profit organization, "New York 4 Harlem", that actively solicited donations of $500 to $5,000 was reported in 2018 to allegedly have been a front for Rodriguez and three other Harlem elected officials. In addition, a flyer organizing a free bus trip to Albany for a conference organized by the NY State Assn. of Black and Puerto Rican Legislators with New York 4 Harlem's name on it featured a picture of Rodriguez and the three other officials. Nonprofit organizations are not allowed to take part in campaign activity. The contact person for the event was a staffer working in the office of one of the other three legislators.

References

External links
Official Assembly Website

|-

1976 births
21st-century American politicians
Hispanic and Latino American state legislators in New York (state)
Living people
Cardinal Hayes High School alumni
Democratic Party members of the New York State Assembly
New York University Stern School of Business alumni
People from East Harlem
Yale University alumni